Estadio Mariano Galvez is a soccer stadium in Santa Lucía Cotzumalguapa, Escuintla in Guatemala, and is home to local first division club Santa Lucía FC.  It has a 15,000-seat capacity.

Mariano Galvez